Seth Holt (21 July 1923 – 14 February 1971) was a Palestinian-born British film director, producer and editor. His films are characterized by their tense atmosphere and suspense, as well as their striking visual style. In the 1960s, Movie magazine championed Holt as one of the finest talents working in the British film industry, although his output was notably sparse.

Biography

Early life
Holt was educated at Blackheath School in London. He originally trained as an actor, and spent a term at RADA in 1940 before acting in repertory in Liverpool and Bideford in Devon working with Paul Scofield at the latter venue. His sister, Joan Holt, was married to film director Robert Hamer from the mid-1930a to the mid-1950s.

At Ealing Studios
In 1942 he joined a documentary film company, Strand, as assistant editor. He worked at Ealing Studios from 1943, at the recommendation of Hamer. He was an editing assistant on films such as Champagne Charlie (1944), The Return of the Vikings (1944), Dead of Night (1945), The Captive Heart (1946), Hue and Cry (1947), Frieda (1947), Scott of the Antarctic (1948), Kind Hearts and Coronets (1949) and Passport to Pimlico (1949).

Holt received his first credit as editor on The Spider and the Fly (1949), made for Mayflower Pictures by Robert Hamer.

Promoted to editor at Ealing, he cut six films for the studio: Dance Hall (1950) and The Lavender Hill Mob (1951), directed by Charles Crichton, His Excellency (1952) for Hamer, Mandy (1952) for Alexander Mackendrick, The Titfield Thunderbolt (1953) and The Love Lottery (1954) for Crichton.

In November 1954, Holt was promoted to producer at Ealing. He worked on Touch and Go (1955), The Ladykillers (1955) with Mackendrick and The Man in the Sky (1957) for Crichton.

Holt graduated to direction with Ealing's penultimate production, Nowhere to Go (1958), which he intended to be "the least Ealing film ever made", co-writing the script with Kenneth Tynan who had been appointed  as an Ealing script editor.

Interim
After Ealing, Holt returned to editing on The Battle of the Sexes (1959) and wrote the script for a short film, Jessy (also 1959). In the Spring 1959 issue of Sight & Sound,  he indicated a wish to make Gratz based on a book by J.P. Donleavy but that he also just wanted to practice his craft.

Holt was reportedly responsible for saving Saturday Night and Sunday Morning (1960) and The Entertainer (1960), his last editing credits. Also in this period, he directed episodes of the Danger Man television series for its initial run which were broadcast in 1960 and 1961.

Hammer Films mainly
His second feature as director was Taste of Fear (US: Scream of Fear, 1961) for Hammer Films, a successful thriller written by Jimmy Sangster and produced by Michael Carreras.

It was followed by Station Six-Sahara (1962), a British-German film shot on location in Libya. British film critic Dilys Powell described it as "true cinema". He did episodes of Espionage.

Holt returned to Hammer to make The Nanny (1965), based on a script by Sangster and starring Bette Davis. It was a huge success and received strong reviews. Pauline Kael called Holt's direction "excellent". Bette Davis, however, once called Holt "the most ruthless director I've ever worked with outside of William Wyler".

Later career
Holt was contracted to make Danger: Diabolik (1965) in Italy with Gilbert Roland. However filming was abandoned after the producer saw the footage and Holt was fired. The film was later reactivated with another director, Mario Bava. By the mid-1960s, he was involved in developing the script for what became if..... Holt was initially to direct Crusaders, by John Howlett and David Sherwin, the project which became if...., but his health was in such crisis that he passed the project to Lindsay Anderson, who extensively reworked the script with David Sherwin.

Holt directed episodes of Court Martial then made a James Bond-style thriller Danger Route (1967). Holt was reportedly ill during filming.

Holt started directing a film about Monsieur Lecoq with Julie Newmar and Zero Mostel but it too was abandoned. He was the executive producer on Adrian Walker's documentary Barbed Water (1968) which is about the whalers of Faial in the Azores.</ref>

In 1970 the National Film Theatre screened a season of his films.

Death
Hammer Films hired Holt to direct Blood from the Mummy's Tomb (1971). "I haven't been directing because I haven't been offered anything to direct," he said at the time. He said he had been developing scripts about the anarchist Bakunin as well as an adaptation of Lady Into a Fox.

He died on the film's set at Elstree Studios during production from a heart attack five weeks into the six-week shoot, collapsing with cast member Aubrey Morris preventing him from falling, according to Christopher Wicking's obituary in The Guardian. The Times death notice for February 13 states he died peacefully at home. His death is believed to have been alcohol related.

TCM's Ben Mankiewicz says it received better reviews than Hammer's other Mummy movies, which suffered from "The curse of the Mummy Movie," and he gave credit to Holt for the improvement. "He took the wrappings off."

According to one obituary his "unfulfilled career was an indictment of the British film industry".

Selected filmography
Champagne Charlie (1944) - assistant editor
The Return of the Vikings (1944) (short feature) - assistant editor
Dead of Night (1945) - second assistant editor
The Captive Heart (1946) - second assistant editor
Hue and Cry (1947) - assistant editor
Frieda (1947) - assembly cutter
Scott of the Antarctic (1948) - assembly cutter
Kind Hearts and Coronets (1949) - assembly cutter
A Run for Your Money (1949) - assistant editor
The Spider and the Fly (1949) - editor
Dance Hall (1950) - editor
The Lavender Hill Mob (1951) - editor
His Excellency (1952) - editor
Crash of Silence aka Mandy (1952) - editor
The Titfield Thunderbolt (1953) - editor
The Love Lottery (1954) - editor
Touch and Go (1955) - associate producer
The Ladykillers (1955) - associate producer
Decision Against Time (1957) - associate producer
Nowhere to Go (1958) - director, writer
Jessy (1959) (short) - writer
The Battle of the Sexes (1959) - editor
Saturday Night and Sunday Morning (1960) - editor
Danger Man (1960–61) - episodes include "The Key", "The Sisters", "Find and Return", "Under the Lake" - director
 Taste of Fear (1961) - director
 Station Six-Sahara (1962) - director
Espionage (1963) - episode "The Liberators" - director
 The Nanny (1965) - director
 Danger: Diabolik (1965) - director of film that was abandoned (later filmed and completed by Mario Bava) 
Court Martial (1966) - episodes "Le Belle France", "Savior of Vladik" - director
 Danger Route (1967) - director
 Monsieur Lecoq (1967) - director (unfinished) 
 Barbed Water (1969) - associate producer
 Blood from the Mummy's Tomb (1971) - director (unfinished)

References

External links 

Seth Holt at BFI Screenonline

1923 births
1971 deaths
British film directors
British expatriates in Mandatory Palestine